The Aethridae are a family of crabs in their own superfamily, Aethroidea. It contains these genera (extinct genera marked †):
Actaeomorpha Miers, 1877
Aethra Latreille in Cuvier, 1816
Drachiella Guinot, in Serene & Soh, 1976
† Eriosachila Blow & Manning, 1996
Hepatella Smith, in Verrill, 1869
† Hepatiscus Bittner, 1875
Hepatus Latreille, 1802
† Mainhepatiscus De Angeli & Beschin, 1999
† Matutites Blow & Manning, 1996
Osachila Stimpson, 1871
† Prehepatus Rathbun, 1935
† Priabonella Beschin, De Angeli, Checchi & Mietto, 2006
† Pseudohepatiscus Blow & Manning, 1996
Sakaila Manning & Holthuis, 1981

References

External links

Crabs
Decapod families